MNPO may stand for:
Median Pre-Optic nucleus (MnPO)
Master of Nonprofit Organizations